Somiedo (Asturian: Somiedu) is a municipality in the Autonomous Community of the Principality of Asturias, Spain. It is bordered on the north by Belmonte de Miranda, on the east by Teverga, on the west by Tineo and Cangas del Narcea, and on the south by the province of León.

It is the second least densely populated municipality in Asturias.

All of the municipality forms part of Somiedo Natural Park, which has been declared a biosphere reserve by Unesco.

Parishes

Politics

References

External links

Hiking routes in Somiedo 
Somiedo Natural Park 
Federación Asturiana de Concejos 
Estado del Embalse de Somiedo 

Municipalities in Asturias